In Japan, the City Hunter manga ran for six years in Shueisha's Weekly Shōnen Jump magazine from Issue 13 of 1985 to Issue 50 of 1991. The first compiled City Hunter collections were published under the Jump Comics imprint from 1985 to 1992, and totaled 35 volumes. The second edition was from Shueisha Editions, who published an 18 book version between 1996 and 1997. Bunch World published a 39 volume edition between 2001 and 2002. Most recently, Tokuma Comics published a "Complete Edition" of 32 books, each with bonus material between 2004 and early 2005.

The North American version of the manga, published by Gutsoon! Entertainment and serialized in Raijin Comics, is only available up to volume 5. The series has also been translated into Chinese, French, German, Italian, Vietnamese, Spanish, and Indonesian.



Volume list

References

City Hunter
chapters